Poncé-sur-le-Loir is a former commune in the Sarthe département in the region of Pays de la Loire in north-western France. On 1 January 2017, it was merged into the new commune Loir en Vallée. Its inhabitants are called Poncéens.

Sights
The Romanesque church of St. Julien of Le Mans stands on a hillside. It possesses a saddleback tower and contains notable Romanesque wall paintings depicting notably the siege of Antioch in 1098. The château is noted for its Renaissance staircase.

Economy
The village, which developed following early industrial (mill) activity, contains potteries and other artisan activities, and also produces Jasnières wine.

See also
Communes of the Sarthe department

References

Former communes of Sarthe